Setting Yesterday Free is the first and only album American Jesus music band Infinity+3. It is the first recorded appearance by songwriter Mark Heard and was originally released independently in 1970, and re-released on Spirit Records in 1972. A limited edition CDR reissue of the album was released to fans in 1998 through Heard's label, Fingerprint Records.

Track listing

 "All My Trials" (Traditional, Noel Paul Stookey/Peter Yarrow, Milton Okun)
 "Life's Ocean" (Mark Heard)
 "You" (Mark Heard)
 "Morning Light" (Jim Evans)
 "Memory" (Jim Evans)
 "Friends" (Mike DeCastro)
 "Presence of the Lord" (Eric Clapton) 
 "Second Best Friend" (Mark Heard)
 "Not Alone" (Mark Heard)
 "A Place Inside" (Mark Heard)
 "Love" (by Mike DeCastro)

Personnel 

 Jim Evans – guitar, vocals
 Mark Heard – guitar, vocals, harmonica, bass guitar
 Terry Rogers – guitar, vocals 
 Grace Miller – vocals
 Mike DeCastro – bass guitar, vocals, organ, piano
 Cathy Dunn – vocals
 Jimmy Moore – drums "A Special Thanks!!"

Production
 Doug Milheim – producer, engineer
 Mark Heard – producer

1970 debut albums